The Ruggiero di Lauria class was a class of ironclad battleships built for the Italian Regia Marina (Royal Navy) during the late 19th century. The three ships—, and –were improved versions of the earlier s. The primary improvements were new breech-loading guns, better armor protection, and more powerful machinery. The ships, designed by Giuseppe Micheli, marked a temporary diversion from the ideas of Benedetto Brin, who had designed the two preceding classes along with the following class.

Construction of the ships was very lengthy, and by the time they were completed, the first pre-dreadnought battleships were being built. Rendered obsolescent by these new ships, the Ruggiero di Laurias had limited careers. The spent their time in service alternating between the Active and Reserve Squadrons, and they were primarily occupied with conducting training exercises. The ships were removed from service in 1909–1911; Francesco Morosini was expended as a target ship, while Ruggiero di Lauria became a floating oil tank and Andrea Doria was converted into a depot ship. During World War I, Andrea Doria returned to service as a guard ship before being repurposed for oil storage after the war, eventually being broken up in 1929. Ruggiero di Lauria survived until 1943, when she was sunk by bombers during World War II. Her wreck was salvaged in 1945.

Design 
Starting in the 1870s, following the Italian fleet's defeat at the Battle of Lissa, the Italians began a large naval expansion program, initially aimed at countering the Austro-Hungarian Navy. The Ruggiero di Laurias were authorized in the naval program for 1880, and the task of designing them was assigned to Engineering Inspector Giuseppe Micheli. Vice Admiral Ferdinando Acton opposed the very large ironclads designed by Brin, and so he charged Micheli with creating a ship that would not exceed . Micheli chose to base his new design on a cut-down version of Duilio, though he incorporated several improvements, including more modern, breech-loading guns, a more powerful propulsion system, and new, more effective compound armor.

General characteristics and machinery 

The ships were built with a high forecastle to improve sea-keeping over the Duilio class. A single military mast with fighting tops was located amidships; a hurricane deck connected the forward and aft superstructure. Both sections of superstructure was used to store several smaller boats; each section also had a large crane to handle the boats. The ships had a crew of 507–509 officers and men.

Their propulsion system consisted of a pair of compound marine steam engines, each driving a single screw propeller, with steam supplied by eight coal-fired, cylindrical fire-tube boilers. The boilers were trunked into two funnels, one in the forward superstructure and the other in the aft superstructure.

Armament and armor 
The Ruggiero di Laurias were armed with a main battery of four  27-caliber rifled breechloading guns, mounted in two pairs en echelon in a central barbette. Their rate of fire was very slow, taking eight minutes to reload after each shot. They carried a secondary battery of two  32-caliber guns, one at the bow and the other at the stern, and four  32-caliber guns. The 152 mm gun fired a variety of shells, including  armor-piercing shells, while the 120 mm guns fired  shells. From 1900, the ships had their secondary battery significantly expanded with two  guns, ten  40-caliber guns, twelve  guns, five 37 mm revolver cannon, and two machine guns. As was customary for capital ships of the period, they carried five  torpedo tubes submerged in the hull.

The ships' protection scheme consisted of compound armor. The barbette had  of steel armor.

Construction 
The ships' construction times were very lengthy; by the time they were completed, the United Kingdom had begun building the s, the first pre-dreadnought battleships, which rendered older ironclad battleships obsolescent. In addition, technological progress, particularly in armor production techniques—first Harvey armor and then Krupp armor—contributed to the ships' rapid obsolescence.

Service history 

The three Ruggiero di Laurias served in the Active Squadron for the first several years of their careers, into the mid-1890s. By 1895, Ruggiero di Lauria had been transferred to the Reserve Squadron, though Andrea Doria and Francesco Morosini remained in the Active Squadron. That year, Ruggiero di Lauria and Andrea Doria joined the Active Squadron for a major cruise to Britain and Germany. All three ships were assigned to the Active Squadron in 1899. That year, Ruggiero di Lauria and Andrea Doria took part in a naval review in Cagliari for the Italian King Umberto I, which included a French and British squadron as well.

All three ships had been transferred to the Reserve Squadron by 1905, and they were quickly discarded. In 1908, the Italian Navy decided to discard Ruggiero di Lauria and Francesco Morosini, while Andrea Doria remained in service until 1911. Francesco Morosini was expended as a target ship for torpedo experiments in September 1909. Ruggiero di Lauria was converted into a floating oil tank in 1909 and was renamed GM 45; she was sunk in an air raid in 1943 during World War II. Andrea Doria served as a depot ship until Italy entered World War I in May 1915, when she was employed as a guard ship in Brindisi. After the war, she too was converted into an oil tank, before being broken up for scrap in 1929.

Notes

References 
 Brassey, Thomas A., ed. (1896). The Naval Annual (Portsmouth: J. Griffin & Co.).
 Brassey, Thomas A., ed. (1899). The Naval Annual (Portsmouth: J. Griffin & Co.).
 
 Brassey, Thomas A., ed. (1908). The Naval Annual (Portsmouth: J. Griffin & Co.).
 
 
 
 
 Neal, William George, ed. (1896). The Marine Engineer (London: Office for Advertisements and Publication) XVII.

Further reading

External links 

 Ruggero di Lauria (1884) Marina Militare website

 

Battleship classes